Lev Zaytsev (born 13 June 1937) is a Soviet speed skater. He competed at the 1960 Winter Olympics and the 1964 Winter Olympics.

References

1937 births
Living people
Soviet male speed skaters
Olympic speed skaters of the Soviet Union
Speed skaters at the 1960 Winter Olympics
Speed skaters at the 1964 Winter Olympics
Sportspeople from Ulyanovsk